The Sokh snakes are two snakes made in stone that were discovered in Sokh, Ferghana valley, Uzbekistan in 1899. It is dated to the 3rd-2nd millennium BCE, and displays stylistic similarities with the contemporary cultures of Mesopotamia, leading archaeologist Philip Kohl to suggest that it was actually imported from Elam, where similar objects can be found.

The culture to which the stone snakes belonged may have been a predecessor, and may have contributed to the formation, of the Chust culture (ca. 1500 to 900 BCE) of Ferghana.

References

Archaeological artifacts
Archaeological discoveries in Uzbekistan
Snakes in art